The Venerable John Rogers (1648–1715) was an Anglican priest in England.

Rogers was born in London was educated at Merchant Taylors and St John's College, Oxford. He held the livings at Seagrave from 1682; and Archdeacon of Leicester from 1703, holding both positions until his death on 9 May 1715.

Notes 

1715 deaths
Alumni of St John's College, Oxford
Archdeacons of Leicester
17th-century English Anglican priests
18th-century English Anglican priests
People educated at Merchant Taylors' School, Northwood
1648 births